The mountain giant Sunda rat, Sundamys infraluteus (also known as the giant mountain rat or giant rat of Sumatra) is a large rat, around 480 to 640 millimeters (19 to 25 inches) in total length (230 to 290 millimeters [9-11.5 inches] excluding the tail).  It weighs 230 to 600 grams.  This makes it somewhat larger than a Norway rat, which averages around 300 grams, with 500 grams being unusually large.  The rat is mostly dark brown with paler brownish specks.  Its long fur is covered with even longer guard hairs.  The tail is uniformly brown.

Habitat and habits 

This species lives in forested mountains, between 700 and 2400 meters.  It is found in southeastern Asia, especially Indonesia and Malaysia.  The species is omnivorous.

Other information 

Arthur Conan Doyle refers to a 'giant rat of Sumatra' in "The Adventure of the Sussex Vampire". Some scholars, including Leslie S. Klinger, have identified that rat as Sundamys infraluteus.

References 

Taxonomy and common names
Description, habits, and habitat

Sundamys
Rats of Asia
Rodents of Malaysia
Rodents of Indonesia
Mammals described in 1888
Taxa named by Oldfield Thomas